George Colman may refer to:

George Colman the Elder (1732–1794), English dramatist
George Colman the Younger (1762–1836), English dramatist, son of the above

See also
George Coleman (disambiguation)